Scrabster Castle was a castle, near Burnside, about  north and west of Thurso, and  south of the village of Scrabster, Highland in Scotland, south of Thurso Bay.  It is on an eroding promontory.

History
Built by the Bishops of Caithness, the castle served as the Bishop's Palace for the bishops of Caithness.  Bishop John of Caithness was mutilated by Harald Maddadsson, Mormaer of Caithness, in 1201, after being besieged at the castle, having his tongue and eyes removed for John's refusal to collect Peter's Pence, a tax of 1/10 of the income of every freeman. George Sinclair, 4th Earl of Caithness, seized the castle in 1544.  The castle was later a royal castle. The castle was in ruins in the early 18th century.

Structure
Scrabster Castle was a castle of enclosure, with a keep.  There is a pillbox within the ruins.

There was a drawbridge towards the land.  While erosion has partly destroyed the curtain wall, with other parts  obscured by turf banks, short stretches of the outer face are exposed. The inner wall-face of a building about  square with a mural chamber is visible.

Notes

Citations

References

External links
Image, map and plan of the castle

Ruined castles in Highland (council area)
Clan Murray